Zakaluzny is a Ukrainian masculine surname. Its feminine counterpart is Zakalyuzhnaya. It may refer to:
Oksana Zakalyuzhnaya (born 1977), Russian basketball player
Polina Zakaluzny (born 1992), Israeli rhythmic gymnast
Walt Zakaluznyj, Canadian association football player 

Ukrainian-language surnames